Borealis is a cruise ship of Fred. Olsen Cruise Lines, sailing since July 2021. She was built as MS Rotterdam and was the co-flagship for Holland America Line, for which she sailed for 22 years.

Construction and career

As Rotterdam 

Commissioned in 1997 by the Holland America Line, the vessel was christened as Rotterdam by Princess Margriet of the Netherlands on 9 December 1997, in Fort Lauderdale, Florida, and made its first call at the Port of Rotterdam on 10 June 1998. Rotterdam was the sixth Holland America vessel to bear the name. MS Rotterdam and her sister ship  were co-flagships of Holland America Line (HAL).

Rotterdam carried an art collection on board worth over US$2 million and featured fine art and antiques.

In September 2004, the vessel lost power when all four engines failed during Hurricane Karl while doing a transatlantic crossing. Swells reached . Many passengers suffered injuries during this period, the most severe being fractured bones. Rotterdam regained power and continued its journey to Halifax, Nova Scotia, arriving on 28 September.

During the summer of 2011, Rotterdam conducted Holland America Line's first standalone transatlantic crossing since 1971, making a single trip both eastbound and westbound.

Refit 
In 2012, Rotterdam received a major refit in Hamburg. The upper aft superstructure was rebuilt with the addition of extra cabins, and the removal of the aft swimming pool.

2020 Coronavirus pandemic

Sold to Fred Olsen cruises 
Due to the pandemic and shutdown of the cruise industry, the flagships Rotterdam and sister Amsterdam were sold to Fred Olsen Cruises in summer 2020. The ship sailed from its namesake city one final time as the Rotterdam on 11 August 2020. A new  (VII) debuted in July 2021.

As Borealis 

In the fall of 2020 the ship sailed to Scotland and was laid up with the rest of Fred Olsen fleet prior to being refitted for service. The name Borealis refers to a ship of the same name that was part of the Fred. Olsen line in 1948, before it became a cruise line. The transformation of Rotterdam to Borealis started in August 2020 at Damen Shipyards in Schiedam, near Rotterdam with completion in July 2021. Shortly after making its maiden trip, Borealis suffered a technical issue that caused the cancellation of a cruise as the ship remained in Portsmouth.

Borealis’ homeport is Liverpool.

References

External links
 

1996 ships
Maritime incidents in 2004
Ships of the Holland America Line
Fred. Olsen & Co.
Ships built in Italy
Ships built by Fincantieri
Cruise ships involved in the COVID-19 pandemic